19 is Alsou's fourth studio album, was released in Russia on 23 January 2003. This album includes songs in Russian and Tatar languages. Alsou wrote one of the songs. The album was very successful in Russia, with the sales of over 800,000 copies (by December 2003). To support this album, Alsou gave live performances during 2003 and 2004 in Russia, Tatarstan, Azerbaijan, Georgia, Ukraine, Latvia, Estonia, Israel and in many other countries. The tour was very successful as well.

Track listing

Bonus tracks in the limited edition:

External links 
 
 Алсу - 19- Russian CD's.

Alsou Abramova albums
2003 albums
Universal Music Group albums
Russian-language albums